M, or m, is the thirteenth letter in the Latin alphabet, used in the modern English alphabet, the alphabets of other western European languages and others worldwide. Its name in English is em (pronounced ), plural ems.

History

The letter M is derived from the Phoenician Mem, via the Greek Mu (Μ, μ). Semitic Mem is most likely derived from a "Proto-Sinaitic"  (Bronze Age) adoption of the  "water" ideogram in Egyptian writing.

Use in writing systems
The letter  represents the bilabial nasal consonant sound  in the orthography of Latin as well as in that of many modern languages, and also in the International Phonetic Alphabet. In English, the Oxford English Dictionary (first edition) says that  is sometimes a vowel, in words like spasm and in the suffix -ism. In modern terminology, this is described as a syllabic consonant (IPA ). M is the fourteenth most frequently used letter in the English language.

In Washo, lower-case  represents a typical em sound, while upper-case  represents a voiceless em sound.

Other uses

 The Roman numeral M represents the number 1000, though it was not used in Roman times. There is, however, scant evidence that the letter was later introduced in the early centuries A.D. by the Romans.
 Unit prefix M (mega), meaning one million times, and m (milli) meaning one-thousandth.
 m is the standard abbreviation for metre (or meter) in the International System of Units (SI). However, m is also used as an abbreviation for mile.
 M is used as the unit abbreviation for molarity.
 With money amounts, m or M can mean one million: For example, $5m is five million dollars.
 M often represents male or masculine, especially in conjunction with F for female or feminine.
 M (James Bond) is a fictional character in Ian Fleming's James Bond book and film series.
 In typography, an em dash is a punctuation symbol whose width is equal to that of a capital letter M.

Related characters

Descendants and related characters in the Latin alphabet

M with diacritics: Ḿ ḿ Ṁ ṁ Ṃ ṃ M̃ m̃ ᵯ
IPA-specific symbols related to M:  
Ɱ : Capital M with hook
Uralic Phonetic Alphabet-specific symbols related to M:

Some symbols related to M were used by the Uralic Phonetic Alphabet prior to its formal standardization in 1902:

The Teuthonista phonetic transcription system uses 
Other variations used for phonetic transcription: ᶆ ᶬ ᶭ
Ɯ ɯ : Turned M
ꟽ : Inverted M was used in ancient Roman texts to stand for mulier (woman)
ꟿ : Archaic M was used in ancient Roman texts to abbreviate the personal name 'Manius' (A regular capital M was used for the more common personal name 'Marcus')
ℳ : currency symbol for Mark

Ancestors and siblings in other alphabets
𐤌 : Semitic letter Mem, from which the following symbols originally derive
Μ μ : Greek letter Mu, from which M derives
 : Coptic letter Me, which derives from Greek Mu
М м : Cyrillic letter Em, also derived from Mu
𐌌 : Old Italic M, which derives from Greek Mu, and is the ancestor of modern Latin M
 : Runic letter Mannaz, which derives from old Italic M
 : Gothic letter manna, which derives from Greek Mu

Ligatures and abbreviations
₥ : Mill (currency)
™ : Trademark symbol
℠ : Service mark symbol

Computing codes

 1

Other representations

References

External links

ISO basic Latin letters